Tullyhogue, also called Tullaghoge or Tullahoge, is a small village and townland in County Tyrone, Northern Ireland. It is within the civil parish of Desertcreat and is about two miles or three kilometres south of Cookstown.

Nearby Tullyhogue Fort was the crowning place of the kings of Tír Eoghain until the Flight of the Earls in 1607.

References 
Cookstown Area Plan 2010

External links 

Tullyhogue Web Site

Villages in County Tyrone
Civil parish of Desertcreat
Cookstown District Council